XEFE-TDT (channel 17) is a television station in Nuevo Laredo, Tamaulipas, Mexico,  known as XEFE, La Imagen Familiar. XEFE primarily carries programming from the public Canal Once network as well as local news, information and entertainment programming. XEFE was the last television station in the Laredo – Nuevo Laredo area to broadcast digitally, doing so for the first time in March 2014.

History
XEFE-TV signed on channel 2 on October 1, 1962, making it the first television station in Nuevo Laredo and second in the Laredo – Nuevo Laredo area after KGNS, which first went on the air January 7, 1956. In February 2013, XEFE received authorization from COFETEL to broadcast in digital on RF channel 17. XEFE began broadcasting in digital in March 2014, ten months ahead of the market's analog shutoff in January 2015.

In October 2016, changes to allotment of virtual channels required XEFE to vacate channel 2 and begin using virtual channel 17, as channel 2 was nationally allocated for Las Estrellas.

Previously carrying national Televisa programming from Gala TV/NU9VE and FOROtv, XEFE dropped Televisa programs on July 1, 2020, and picked up national news and some programs from public Canal Once, which does not have a transmitter in the market.

Digital television
XEFE began broadcasting in digital in March 2014, making it the last television station in the Laredo–Nuevo Laredo area to broadcast in digital, just ten months before analog shutoff in the Nuevo Laredo area in January 2015. It has one subchannel, 17.1, carrying its main programming.

References

External links
Official Facebook page

EFE-TDT
Television channels and stations established in 1962
Spanish-language television stations in Mexico